Prairie Grove is a village in McHenry County, Illinois, United States, first incorporated in 1973. Per the 2020 census, the population was 1,963.

History
Though Prairie Grove had been inhabited by settlers since the early 19th century, the Village of Prairie Grove was incorporated in 1973. Since 2004, Prairie Grove has been a home rule community.

Education
Prairie Grove is served by Prairie Grove School District 46 and Crystal Lake Community Consolidated School District 47, both of which are for students through 8th grade, and Community High School District 155, specifically Prairie Ridge High School, for students in high school.

Geography
Prairie Grove is located at  (42.2768346, -88.2693750).

Demographics

2020 census

2000 Census
As of the census of 2000, there were 960 people, 303 households, and 262 families residing in the village. The racial makeup of the village was 96.98% White, 0.62% African American, 0.21% Native American, 1.04% Asian, 0.42% from other races, and 0.73% from two or more races. Hispanic or Latino of any race were 1.25% of the population.

There are households, out of which 46.2% had children under the age of 18 living with them, 80.5% were married couples living together, 3.6% had a female householder with no husband present, and 13.5% were non-families. 7.9% of all households were made up of individuals, and 2.3% had someone living alone who was 65 years of age or older. The average household size was 3.17 and the average family size was 3.37.

In the village, the population was spread out, with 31.0% under the age of 18, 6.1% from 18 to 24, 29.4% from 25 to 44, 27.3% from 45 to 64, and 6.1% who were 65 years of age or older. The median age was 37 years. For every 100 females, there were 97.1 males. For every 100 females age 18 and over, there were 102.4 males.

The median income for a household in the village was $93,361, and the median income for a family was $102,087. Males had a median income of $70,417 versus $30,313 for females. The per capita income for the village was $36,234. None of the families and 1.3% of the population were living below the poverty line, including no under eighteens and none of those over 64.

See also
Crystal Lake, Illinois
Bull Valley, Illinois
Oakwood Hills, Illinois

References

Villages in McHenry County, Illinois
Villages in Illinois
Chicago metropolitan area